Lycée Valentine Labbé is a senior high school/sixth-form college in La Madeleine, Nord, France, in the Lille Metropole.

It is two tram stations away from Gare Lille Flandres.

The school has a boarding facility.

References

External links
 Lycée Valentine Labbé 

Education in Lille
Lycées in Nord (French department)
Buildings and structures in Nord (French department)
Boarding schools in France